Bruno Garcia da Silva (born 29 November 1970) is a Brazilian actor.

Filmography
2013 - Turbo (brazilian voice)
2012 - De Pernas pro Ar 2
2010 - De Pernas pro Ar
2006 - Saneamento Básico
2006 - Cleópatra
2005 - Sal de Prata
2003 - Bala na marca do Pênalti (short film)
2003 - Dom
2003 - Lisbela e o Prisioneiro
2001 - Ismael e Adalgisa
2000 - O Auto da Compadecida
2000 - Cronicamente Inviável
1999 - Castro Alves - Retrato Falado do Poeta
1998 - Ilusionistas Rumo ao Terceiro Milênio (also directed)

Short films
2001 - Oswaldo Cruz, O médico do Brasil
1994 - That's a Lero-Lero
1994 - Geraldo Voador
1989 - Que M... É Essa? (also directed)
1988 - Batom
1987 - Andy Warhol Está Morto

Television work
Telenovelas
2013 - Sangue Bom
2011 - Aquele Beijo
2008 - Três Irmãs
2006 - Pé na Jaca
2005 - Bang Bang
2004 - Começar de Novo
2003 - Kubanacan
2002 - Coração de Estudante
1999 - Força de um Desejo
1991 - Felicidade

Mini-series
2002 - O Quinto dos Infernos
2001 - Os Maias
1999 - Luna caliente
1998 - Dona Flor e Seus Dois Maridos
1997 - A Comédia da Vida Privada

Series
2016 - Sob Pressão
2016 - Nada Será Como Antes
2010 - S.O.S. Emergência
2004/05 - A Diarista
2004 - Sob Nova Direção
2003 - Sexo Frágil
2002/04 - Os Normais
2001 - Brava Gente
1994/99 - Você Decide

Stage work
2007 - Apareceu a Margarida (directed)
2004/05 - A Maldição do Vale Negro
2002 - Desejos, Bazófias e Quedas
2002 - Homem Objeto
2000 - Lisbela e o Prisioneiro
1996 - Polaroídes Explícitas
1996 - O Burguês Ridículo
1995 - A Ver Estrelas
1988 - Hamlet
1985 - Hipopocaré

References

External links

1970 births
Living people
Male actors from Recife
Brazilian male film actors
Brazilian male telenovela actors
Brazilian male television actors